Disco Dancer is a 1982 Indian dance film, written by Rahi Masoom Raza and directed by Babbar Subhash. It stars Mithun Chakraborty and Kim in leading roles, with Om Puri, Gita Siddharth and Karan Razdan in supporting roles with Rajesh Khanna in a friendly appearance.

The film tells the rags-to-riches story of a young street performer from the slums of Bombay. The film is known for its filmi disco Bollywood songs, composed by Bappi Lahiri and written by Anjaan and Faruk Kaiser. Popular songs include "Jimmy Jimmy Jimmy Aaja" sung by Parvati Khan, "I am a Disco Dancer" sung by Vijay Benedict, "Yaad Aa Raha Hai" sung by Bappi Lahiri, and "Goro Ki Na Kaalo Ki" sung by Suresh Wadkar with Usha Mangeshkar.

The film was a worldwide success, with its popularity extending across Asia, the Soviet Union, Eastern Europe, the Middle East, Turkey, and Africa. Disco Dancer was also the second highest-grossing film ever in the Soviet Union and the highest-grossing foreign film. Disco Dancer established Mithun as a household name across South Asia and the Soviet Union and many countries in Africa where Jimmy has become a more popular name for Mithun Chakraborty. The soundtrack album was also a success, having gone Platinum in India and received a Gold Award in China. Adjusted for inflation, it is still one of the highest-grossing Indian films of all time.

Plot

Anil, a street performer and wedding singer from the slums of Bombay, is scarred by the memory of the rich P. N. Oberoi beating his mother in an incident during his childhood. When manager David Brown is fed up with the tantrums of current Indian disco champion Sam and looks for some new talent, he happens to see Anil dance-walking across a street. Rebranded as 'Jimmy', the rising disco star must take the throne from Sam and win the heart of Rita, Oberoi's daughter.

All seems to be going well until Oberoi hires men to connect Jimmy's electric guitar to 5,000 volts of electricity, causing Jimmy's mother to die in a tragic accident. Jimmy gets guitar phobia after witnessing his mother's death. Later, Oberoi's goons break his legs. With help from Rita, Jimmy begins to walk.

Jimmy must claim first place for Team India at the International Disco Dancing Competition amidst strong competition from Team Africa (Disco King and Queen) and Paris (Disco King and Queen). Jimmy is reluctant to dance, but Rita persuades him to do so. Sam arrives with a guitar to scare Jimmy. Rita manages to drag the show to encourage Jimmy to sing but to no avail. The crowd pelts him with stones which hit his head. Jimmy's uncle Raju arrives and advises him to infuse his mother and his music; he throws the guitar to Jimmy, after which Jimmy begins to sing. Oberoi's goons kill Raju, after which Jimmy travels to their lair and beats them up. In the ensuing fight, Oberoi is electrocuted.

Cast

 Mithun Chakraborty as Anil / Jimmy
 Kim as Rita Oberoi
 Rajesh Khanna as Master Raju
 Om Puri as David Brown
 Om Shivpuri as P.N. Oberoi
 Gita Siddharth as Radha
 Karan Razdan as Sam
 Yusuf Khan as Vasco
 Bob Christo as a Russian goon
 Kalpana Iyer as Nikki Brown
 Master Chhotu as younger Anil
 Baby Pinky as younger Rita

Production
The title song I am a Disco Dancer was shot at Natraj Studio in Mumbai over three days, where scenes featuring Mithun Chakrobarty's signature moves were filmed. Thereafter, the shooting featured crowds scenes at Filmistan Studio in Mumbai.

Soundtrack 

The music for all the songs were composed by Bappi Lahiri and the lyrics were penned by Anjaan and Faruk Kaiser. The tracks on the 1982 soundtrack album are as follows:

The song "Yaad Aa Raha Hai" has been described as a synthesized, minimalist, high-tempo, electronic disco song. Geeta Dayal described it as a "disco anthem for the ages, and one of the best songs Lahiri ever did."

The song "Jimmy Jimmy Jimmy Aaja" has similarities to 1980 French disco song "T’es OK" by Ottawan. The song "Auva Auva" (picturized on Karan Razdan's character Sam) was inspired by the 1979 synthpop hit "Video Killed the Radio Star" by The Buggles. The song "Cerrone's Paradise" by Cerrone was used in the scene when David Brown discovers Anil who is dance-walking down a street. The song "Krishna Dharti Pe Aaja Tu" was inspired by  "Jesus" by Tielman Brothers. This version was used in the movie where Jimmy is practicing dance.

The Disco Dancer soundtrack was popular worldwide, particularly in India, the Soviet Union, and China. The soundtrack went Platinum in India, equivalent to 1million sales, and received a Gold Award in China.

Box office

In India, the film grossed  in 1982. It was the 7th or 14th highest-grossing film at the domestic Indian box office in 1982, with its strongest commercial performance in the West Bengal state, home to actor Mithun Chakraborty and composer Bappi Lahiri.

In the Soviet Union, the film released in 1984, with 1,013 prints. It drew an audience of 60.9million viewers in 1984, becoming the most successful film at the Soviet box office that year, the biggest foreign hit in the 1980s, the fourth biggest box office hit of the decade, the eighth biggest foreign hit of all time, and one of the top 25 biggest box office hits of all time. Including re-runs, the film sold an estimated million tickets in the Soviet Union. In terms of gross revenue, it earned 60 million Soviet rubles (US$75.85 million, 94.28 crore), the highest for an Indian film, surpassing Awaaras 29 million roubles. This made it the highest-grossing Indian film overseas up until it was surpassed by the over 100 crore overseas gross of My Name is Khan (2010) and 3 Idiots (2009).

Disco Dancer was also a success in China, when it released there in 1983. The song "Jimmy Jimmy" was popular there. According to Aamir Khan, Mithun Chakraborty is famous in China due to the song.

Worldwide, Disco Dancer grossed a combined  crore (US$ million) in India and the Soviet Union. This surpassed the 35 crore gross of Sholay (1975), making Disco Dancer the highest-grossing Indian film worldwide up until it was surpassed by the 135 crore gross of Hum Aapke Hain Koun (1994). Disco Dancer was the first Indian film to gross 100 crore worldwide.

Remakes
It was remade in Tamil as Paadum Vaanampadi with Anand Babu, and in Telugu as Disco King with Nandamuri Balakrishna.

Legacy
Upon release, Disco Dancer was a phenomenon, both domestically and internationally. Prior to the film's release, Bollywood was dominated by "angry young man" Bombay underworld films, an  action crime film genre pioneered by screenwriter duo Salim–Javed a decade earlier in the early 1970s. These films often explored socialist and "hero versus system" themes, often presented a poor hero's journey from rags-to-riches, and involved violent revenge plots against villains. Disco Dancer took the "angry young man" genre and subverted it: instead of having Jimmy fight the villains or get revenge through violence, he instead gets revenge and defeats the villains through disco dancing. This led to a wave of disco-themed Bollywood musicals in India, and it become a global phenomenon outside of India. It was a blockbuster in Asia and the former Soviet Union, and drew a large global cult following, from Japan where a Jimmy statue was built in Osaka, to the West where Disco Dancer became the defining example of a stereotypical "Bollywood" film. Retrospectively, the film has received a polarizing critical reception, with praise for its music and dance numbers but criticism towards its plot, with Anuvab Pal calling it an ironic comedy film.

Popular culture
The title song "I Am a Disco Dancer" was the inspiration for Devo's song "Disco Dancer" (1988).

The British Sri Lankan alternative rapper M.I.A. covered "Jimmy Jimmy Jimmy Aaja" as "Jimmy" in 2007 for her album Kala. There have been cover versions of "Jimmy Jimmy Aaja Aaja" from other international musicians, including the 1998 hit "Jimmy" by Russian techno group Ruki Vverh, "Jimmy Jimmy" by Russian artists DJ Slon and Angel-A, and a cover version by Tibetan artist Kelsang Metok.

The music from "Jimmy Jimmy Aaja Aaja" was used in the final fight scene in the Adam Sandler film You Don't Mess with the Zohan.

In 2010, the songs "I Am a Disco Dancer" and "Yaad Aa Raha Hai" were used in the 2010 Bollywood comedy film, Golmaal 3, directed by Rohit Shetty. The songs were relevant to the performance of Mithun Chakraborty's character Pritam, who reflected on his past as a young mega-hit disco dancer.

Aamir Khan's special appearance as Disco Fighter in the Imran Khan starrer 2011 film Delhi Belly is inspired by Mithun Chakraborty's role in Disco Dancer.

"Jimmy Jimmy Aaja Aaja" and "I Am a Disco Dancer" are very popular in countries such as Mongolia and post-Soviet states such as Russia, Azerbaijan, and Uzbekistan.

Baimurat Allaberiyev, an ethnic Uzbek from Tajikistan, became an internet sensation by singing "Goron Ki Na Kalon Ki" and "Jimmy Aaja" in a warehouse. The 2008 video recorded on a mobile phone got over 1 million views on YouTube. He landed an acting role in a Russian comedy film, Six Degrees of Celebration (2010).

The film's soundtrack was used during the end credits of the 2019 Tamil film Super Deluxe.

See also
100 Crore Club
List of highest-grossing Indian films
List of highest-grossing Indian films in overseas markets
List of highest-grossing films in the Soviet Union

Notes

References

External links

 

1982 films
1980s dance films
1980s Hindi-language films
1980s Urdu-language films
1980s musical comedy-drama films
Films directed by Babbar Subhash
Films scored by Bappi Lahiri
Films set in India
Disco films
Hindi films remade in other languages
Indian dance films
Indian films about revenge
Indian musical comedy-drama films
Urdu films remade in other languages
1982 drama films
Urdu-language Indian films